Tarneit Plains is a suburb in Melbourne, Victoria, Australia,  west of Melbourne's Central Business District, located within the City of Melton local government area.

History

Tarneit Plains is located in the Kulin nation, traditional Aboriginal country. The Wathaurong and Woiwurrung people are local custodians within the Kulin nation. The suburb was gazetted and approved by the Victorian government in 2017. Prior to the suburb's creation, the area was part of Truganina. The City of Melton had retained the postcode for Tarneit Plains.

References

Suburbs of Melbourne
City of Melton